Enrique Ghersi (born 1961) is a Peruvian lawyer, professor and free market intellectual.

Biography

Early life
Enrique Ghersi was born in Lima, Peru in 1961.

Career
He has been a member of the Peruvian Parliament since the 1990s.

He is a professor at the Peruvian University of Applied Sciences and the University of Lima. He has also been a visiting professor at Universidad Francisco Marroquín in Guatemala, an honorary professor of Universidad Laica Vicente Rocafuerte de Guayaquil in Ecuador, and visiting professor at the School Superior of Administration of Companies in Buenos Aires.

He is an adjunct scholar at the Cato Institute. He is also an adjunct fellow and member of the board of advisors of the Center on Global Prosperity at the Independent Institute. He sits as vice president on the board of directors of the Mont Pelerin Society. He serves as president of the Centro de Investigaciones y Estudios Legales in Lima, Peru.

Bibliography
The Other Path (with Hernando de Soto Polar)

References

Living people
20th-century Peruvian lawyers
Academic staff of the University of Lima
1961 births
Cato Institute people
Academic staff of the Peruvian University of Applied Sciences
21st-century Peruvian lawyers